Suzi Rawn (born August 31, 1982 in Sault Ste. Marie, Ontario) is a Canadian recording artist and was the fourth-place finisher in Canadian Idol season 3.  She is known for her rock and blues singing style as well as her unique clothing amongst the Canadian Idol finalists.  Her hometown is Kamloops, but she grew up in Ottawa and has lived in Calgary and Montreal. She has a daughter named Jolie (born on July 22, 2003).

Canadian Idol
Songs Suzi has performed this season include:
 Audition: "Let It Rain" (Amanda Marshall)
 Top 183: "Me and Bobby McGee" (Janis Joplin)
 Top 48: "I Have Nothing" (Whitney Houston)
 Top 32: "Fortunate Son" (Creedence Clearwater Revival)
 Top 10: "Everytime I See Your Picture" (Luba) (Canadian Hits week)
 Top 9: "Higher Ground" (Stevie Wonder week)
 Top 8: "Heartbreaker" (Pat Benatar) (Eighties week)
 Top 7: "Minnie the Moocher" (Big Band week)
 Top 6: "Piece Of My Heart" (Janis Joplin) (Classic Rock week)
 Top 5: "American Woman" (The Guess Who week)
 Top 4: "Heartbreak Hotel", "I Can't Help Falling in Love" (Elvis week)

Rawn was in the bottom three on three occasions until she received the lowest number of votes on August 31 and was sent home.

Discography

Rawn's major-label debut album, "Naked", was released on October 10 on Sony BMG. The first single from the album, also called "Naked" was released to radio stations across Canada.

Solo

On My Own (2002)
Track Listing:
1) Intro Song 
2) Green Eyed Monster  
3) Keep On 
4) On My Own 
5) Tunnel Vision 
6) Joe 
7) Mother Nature 
8) White Sand Beach 
9) Companion 
10) Of Love We Speak 
11) Truth Be Known 
12) City Madness 
13) Listen To The Rain

Naked (2006)
Track Listing
1) Bet U Like Me 
2) Naked 
3) Don't Come Easy 
4) Overrated 
5) Raw 
6) Broken 
7) Sorry For You 
8) Understand You 
9) Don't Leave Me 
10) It Was You 
11) I Won't Fall Apart

Singles: Naked (2006), Bet U Like Me (2007)

Reception
This album has sold approximately 950 copies.

King Size Suzi

Green Eyed Monster (2004)
Track Listing:
1) Monster 
2) Truth Be Known 
3) I Will Remember You 
4) Colours Change 
5) Can't Get Enough 
6) Joe 
7) On My Own 
8) Green Eyed Monster 
9) Built To Last 
10) White Sand Beach 
11) More

Because of Love (2004)
Track Listing:
1) Because Of Love 
2) What You Do To Me 
3) Sexface 
4) Bad Dream 
5) I've Been Killed 
6) Get Yourself Together 
7) Obvious Tension 
8) Just A Fool 
9) City Madness 
10) In The Air (Bonus Live Track)

Because of Love II (2005)
Track Listing
1) Because Of Love 
2) What You Do To Me 
3) Monster 
4) Bad Dream 
5) I Will Remember You 
6) Get Yourself Together 
7) Truth Be Known 
8) Just A Fool 
9) Can't Get Enough 
10) On My Own

Featured On
Canadian Idol 3: High Notes (2005)
Track #5: "Fortunate Son"

External links
Largest Suzi Rawn Fansite
Official Homepage
 Suzi's official CTV bio
 A large Suzi fansite
 Suzi Rawn's MySpace
 The official website of Suzi's band, King Size Suzi

1982 births
Canadian Idol participants
Living people
Musicians from Sault Ste. Marie, Ontario
21st-century Canadian women singers